Gulabo Sapera (aka Gulabo or Dhanvantri; born 1973) is an Indian dancer from Rajasthan, India.

Personal life
Gulabo was born in 1973 in the nomadic Kalbaliya community. She was the seventh child of her parents. Gulabo Sapera became a celebrity dancer later in life.

In 2011, Gulabo featured in the reality television show Bigg Boss as contestant no. 12. On the show, she told the audience that she had been buried alive right after her birth, to be rescued by her mother and aunt.

Awards
The Government of India awarded her the Padma Shri in 2016.
Bharat Gaurav Award 2021

Television

References 

Indian female dancers
Living people
Recipients of the Padma Shri in arts
1960 births
Dancers from Rajasthan
21st-century Indian women artists
21st-century Indian dancers
Women artists from Rajasthan
Bigg Boss (Hindi TV series) contestants